Service tree can refer to:

 Species of Sorbus, particularly:
 Sorbus domestica
 Sorbus latifolia, service tree of Fontainebleau
 Sorbus torminalis, wild service tree
 Sorbus pseudofennica, Arran service tree

See also
 Serviceberry, Amelanchier